Urban camouflage is the use of camouflage patterns chosen to make soldiers and equipment harder to see in built-up areas, places such as cities and industrial parks, during urban warfare.

Several armed forces have developed urban camouflage patterns. Some are in use with paramilitary forces.

History

Urban camouflage has rarely been used by armed forces in built up environments and mostly for limited trials. During the Cold War, the British Army used vehicles painted in the "Berlin camouflage" urban pattern.

Techniques of developing urban camouflage have varied across time. In 1990, the US Army's Natick Research, Development and Engineering Center (now the Combat Capabilities Development Command Soldier Center) analyzed individual samples of terrain ranging from rubble piles to stucco through the Terrain Analysis System (TAS). From these samples, the TAS gathered spectrophotometric data in order to determine the most prominent colours. This was known as the "clustering" procedure, where pixels of the scene were grouped by colour into "domains". These domains provided data that demonstrated the range of colours in the scene through mean colour difference and CIELAB values. The results provided by the TAS were used to assist in the development of candidate urban camouflage patterns.

The US Army developed and evaluated two two-colour and one three-colour prototype patterns for a projected Military Operations on Urbanized Terrain (MOUT) camouflage uniform in 1994. The patterns showed promise but were never adopted.

Gallery

References

Camouflage patterns